The Hall of Game Awards was an award show held by Cartoon Network. The inaugural show was hosted by Tony Hawk and aired
on February 25, 2011. There were four installments of the awards, the last being held in 2014.

2011
The 2011 Hall of Game awards were hosted by Tony Hawk and featured musical performances by Travie McCoy and Far East Movement.

Winners and nominees
Winners are listed first and highlighted in boldface.

Presenters

 Nnamdi Asomugha
 Jake T. Austin
 Justin Bieber
 Drew Brees
 Shannon Brown
 Chewbacca
 Chris Cole
 Lucas Cruikshank
 Snoop Dogg
 Cast of Dude, What Would Happen
 Rick Fox
 Zachary Gordon
 Blake Griffin
 David Henrie
 Teck Holmes
 Greg Jennings
 Joe Johnson
 A. J. Hawk
 Jimmy Kimmel
 Lisa Leslie
 George Lopez
 Nelly
 Bobbe J. Thompson
 Venus Williams
 Andrew W.K.

2012
The 2012 Hall of Game Awards were hosted by Shaquille O'Neal and featured musical performances by Flo Rida and Hot Chelle Rae.

Winners and nominees
Winners are listed first and highlighted in boldface.

Presenters

Mordecai and Rigby from Regular Show - appearances throughout the show
Nick Cannon - presented Captain Clutch
The Miz and Zachary Gordon - presented Alti-Dude
Torii Hunter - presented the Most Awesome Mascot nominees throughout the show
The Cast of Level Up - presented Hot Chelle Rae
Leo Howard and Terrell Suggs - presented Dynamic Duo
The Cast of Dude, What Would Happen and Jimmie Johnson - presented In It To Win It
Drew Brees - presented King of the Kick
Nathan Kress - presented Dance Machine
China Anne McClain and Jimmy Graham - presented She's Got Game
Adam Hicks and A. J. Green - presented Flo Rida
Orange and Tennis Ball from The Annoying Orange - presented Miscellaneous Awards
Maya Gabeira, Clayton Kershaw and Noah Flegel - presented Gnarliest Newb
Rico Rodriguez - performed the "First Human Slingshot Dunk"
Jennette McCurdy and Tony Gonzalez - presented the Most Awesome Mascot winner

Voices included J. G. Quintel, William Salyers (as characters Mordecai and Rigby from Regular Show), and Dane Boedigheimer (as The Annoying Orange).

2013
Shaquille agreed to host the show again with Nick Cannon as the co-host. It was held on February 11 and it featured a musical performance by The Wanted.

Winners and nominees
Winners are listed first and highlighted in boldface.

Presenters

 Jessica Alba
 The cast of Big Time Rush
 Lucas Cruikshank
 Victor Cruz
 Snoop Dogg
 Alyson Felix
 Antonio Gates
 Jonny Gomes
 The cast of Incredible Crew
 Chris Johnson
 Coco Jones

 Colin Kaepernick
 The cast of Level Up
 Laura Marano
 Bridgit Mendler
 Dominic Monaghan
 Jeff Probst
 Rico & Raini Rodriguez
 Toby Turner
 Kerri Walsh Jennings
 The Wanted
 J. J. Watt

Voices included Dane Boedigheimer (as The Annoying Orange).

2014
2014 Hall of Game Awards was hosted by Colin Kaepernick and Cam Newton and featured a musical performance by Fall Out Boy and Jason Derulo. With Nickelodeon airing the 2014 Kids' Choice Sports in July 2014, this would be the last Hall of Game ceremony.

Winners and nominees
Winners are listed first and highlighted in boldface

See also 
Kids' Choice Sports

References

External links
 Official website (archived March 8, 2011)

American television awards
Awards established in 2011
2011 establishments in the United States
Awards disestablished in 2014
2014 disestablishments in the United States
American sports trophies and awards
Cartoon Network original programming